Georgeanne Marie Rice is an American actress.

Biography

Rice graduated from The Ohio State University, with a bachelor of fine arts in musical theatre. Following her graduation, Rice served as an apprentice at Burt Reynolds's Maltz Jupiter Theatre in Jupiter, Florida. While there, she appeared in Mame, directed by Charles Nelson Reilly, and I'm Not Rappaport, directed by Burt Reynolds.

On television, Rice portrayed Lavonne Overton on Delta, Karen Larsen on Do Over, Samantha Glick on Harry and the Hendersons, Carlie Watkins on The John Larroquette Show, and Charlotte Lerner on Significant Others. 

Rice married actor Ted McGinley, and they have two sons, Beau and Quinn. They reside in Los Angeles.

Filmography

References

External links
 
 
 

Living people
American film actresses
American television actresses
Actresses from Columbus, Ohio
Ohio State University alumni
20th-century American actresses
21st-century American actresses
Year of birth missing (living people)